Beanfeast was a vegetarian processed food made by Batchelors, from soya.  It was sold in dried form, in packets, to be mixed with water and boiled, the cooked product resembling mince. The product was marketed in three varieties: Savoury Mince, Bolognese Style and Mexican Chilli.

Beanfeast was the focus of protests against its manufacturer, Unilever, when it was found to contain genetically modified (GM) soya. The sales of the product dropped by 50%. After a meeting with Greenpeace in April 1999, Unilever agreed to remove GM ingredients.

The product was discontinued by Batchelors in early 2020, with the explanation that it was "not selling well".

See also

 List of meat substitutes

References

Soy product brands
Meat substitutes
Campbell Soup Company brands